Platycotis is a genus of treehoppers in the family Membracidae. There are about 13 described species in Platycotis.

Species
These 13 species belong to the genus Platycotis:

 Platycotis acutangula Stål, 1869
 Platycotis asodalis Goding
 Platycotis cornuta Plummer, 1936
 Platycotis fuscata Fowler, 1897
 Platycotis histrionica Stål
 Platycotis maritima
 Platycotis minax Goding, 1892
 Platycotis nigrorufa Walker, 1858
 Platycotis salvini Fowler
 Platycotis spreta Goding
 Platycotis tuberculata Fairmaire, 1846
 Platycotis vittata (Fabricius, 1803) (oak treehopper)

References

Further reading

External links

 

Membracinae